André Höhne (also spelled Hoehne; born 10 March 1978 in Berlin) is a German race walker.

He finished 14th in the 20 kilometres walk at the 2009 World Championships in Athletics, crossing the line with a time of 1:21:59.

Achievements

External links
 
 
 
 
 

1978 births
Living people
German male racewalkers
German national athletics champions
Olympic athletes of Germany
Athletes (track and field) at the 2004 Summer Olympics
Athletes (track and field) at the 2008 Summer Olympics
Athletes (track and field) at the 2012 Summer Olympics